Sphenomorphus modiglianii  is a species of skink found in Indonesia.

References

modiglianii
Reptiles described in 1894
Taxa named by George Albert Boulenger
Reptiles of Borneo